EMK may refer to:

 Communist Movement of Euskadi
 Eastern Maninka language
 Early Middle Korean
 Emmonak Airport, in Alaska
 ELKL Motif Kinase; see MARK2
 Evangelisch-methodistische Kirche, the United Methodist Church in Germany
 Several organizations named for US Senator Edward M. Kennedy, such as the Edward M. Kennedy Institute for the United States Senate in Boston, Massachusetts